Bruno Lochet (born 18 October 1959) is a French actor. He is best known for playing in the cult TV series Les Deschiens (1993–2002), in which he played alongside Yolande Moreau.

Theater

Filmography

References

External links 

French male film actors
Living people
20th-century French male actors
21st-century French male actors
French male stage actors
French male television actors
1959 births
People from Le Mans